Dean Yendall (born 1974) is an Australian jockey based in Victoria. 

Yendall began his career in 1991. As of early July 2021, he has ridden 2,551 winners, including six in Group One races. He is a lightweight jockey, able to ride at 49 kilograms. He has twice won the Group One Empire Rose Stakes, on the three-year-old fillies I Am A Star in 2016 and Shoals in 2017, who each carried 49 kilograms.

Yendall has won the Victorian country jockeys' premiership several times, and has consistently ridden more than 100 winners a season in recent years, mostly in country races. His wife is fellow jockey Christine Puls. In April 2016 they rode a dead heat at a race meeting at Mildura.

References

1974 births
Living people
Australian jockeys